Love, Heartbreak, & Everything in Between is the second studio album by Canadian country music artist Tenille Arts. It was released on January 10, 2020 through 19th & Grand Records and Reviver Records. It includes the singles "I Hate This", "Call You Names", "Somebody Like That", and "Everybody Knows Everybody".

Track listing

Charts

Release history

References

2020 albums
Tenille Arts albums